Grain beetle may refer to:
Flat grain beetle
Foreign grain beetle
Merchant grain beetle
Saw-toothed grain beetle

See also:
Flour beetle

Animal common name disambiguation pages